Atylotus latistriatus  is a Palearctic species of horse fly in the family Tabanidae.

References

External links
Images representing Atylotus latistriatus 

Tabanidae
Insects described in 1880
Diptera of Europe
Diptera of Africa
Taxa named by Friedrich Moritz Brauer